Painkiller is a supervillain appearing in American comic books published by DC Comics. The character, created by writer Tony Isabella and artist Eddie Newell, debuted in Black Lightning, Vol. 2 #2 (March 1995). The character is depicted as an enemy of Black Lightning.

Jordan Calloway portrays a variation of Painkiller in The CW's live-action Arrowverse television series Black Lightning.

Publication history
Painkiller debuted in Black Lightning, Vol. 2 #2 (March 1995), written by Tony Isabella and illustrated by Eddie Newell. The character dies just two issues later in Black Lightning, Vol. 2 #4 (May 1995).

Fictional character biography
Painkiller, a high-level mob enforcer, is hired by the Brothers Who Rule to stop Black Lightning's pursuit of them. Painkiller sets a trap for Black Lightning as well as the cops, a crack house full of teenagers, where he plans to kill Black Lightning and force the cops to open fire on the teenagers. However, Black Lightning's powers provide a level of protection from Painkiller's abilities and Black Lightning is able to prevent the massacre before battling with Painkiller, a battle that ultimately kills the latter.

Powers and abilities
As a metahuman, Painkiller exhibits superhuman strength and can induce anesthetization on any part of the human body, thus dulling the senses of his victims. He is also a skilled fighter and has knives on the ends of his dreadlocks which he uses as additional weapons.

In other media

Painkiller appears in Black Lightning, portrayed by Jordan Calloway. Introduced as a civilian in the first season, this version is Khalil Payne, a high school track star and girlfriend of Jennifer Pierce from Freeland who intends to go to college and eventually join the Olympics, but is left paralyzed after getting caught in the crossfire of the 100's attack on a peace march against them. Embittered and depressed, he breaks up with Jennifer, drops out of school, and is convinced by the 100's leader Tobias Whale into working for him as his right hand in exchange for the ability to walk. Khalil accepts, receives cybernetic enhancements that grant enhanced strength and arm-mounted dart launchers that fire paralytic agent-laced darts, and takes the name "Painkiller". Despite this, he displays lingering feelings for Jennifer and expresses regret. In the second season, Khalil refuses to carry out a hit and goes on the run with Jennifer after Whale places a bounty on him. Though they later return in exchange for Khalil receiving police protection, While gets ahold of him and rips out his spinal implant, eventually killing him, before the A.S.A. acquire his body and revive him. In the third season, he ends up in the A.S.A.'s custody and is forced to serve them after being implanted with an obedience chip until Jennifer and T.C. nullify his Painkiller programming, giving Khalil control of his body back, though he struggles with keeping his Painkiller side from fulfilling his mission to kill the Pierce family. In the fourth season, Khalil began operating in Akashic Valley, having reached an agreement with Painkiller, before returning to Freeland to help Jennifer and her family apprehend Looker and kill Ishmael. Following Whale's death, T.C. helps remove a kill code in Khalil's programming at the cost of his memories of the Pierce family.
 Calloway was set to reprise his role as Painkiller in a self-titled spin-off series, in which he is described to have undergone a transformation from a supervillain to someone who strives to "bring justice where he once gave out punishment" while simultaneously struggling to deal with and harness his Painkiller side. A backdoor pilot aired in the aforementioned fourth season of Black Lightning,  but the project was shelved the following year in May.

References

Characters created by Tony Isabella
DC Comics characters with superhuman strength
DC Comics supervillains
Fictional assassins in comics